Hesperia, the branded skippers, is a Holarctic genus in the skippers (Hesperiidae) butterfly family. Most species are endemic to North America, Hesperia comma is widespread throughout the region. H. florinda is endemic to temperate eastern Asia. H. nabokovi is endemic to Hispaniola.

Presumably, Johan Christian Fabricius named the genus for Hesperia, one of the Hesperides.

Species
The following species are recognised in the genus Hesperia:
 Hesperia assiniboia (Lyman, 1892) – Plains skipper
 Hesperia attalus (W. H. Edwards, 1871) – dotted skipper – south United States
 Hesperia caucasica Riabov, 1926 Caucasus
 Hesperia colorado (Scudder, 1874) – western branded skipper
 Hesperia columbia (Scudder, 1872) – Columbian skipper – California to Southwest Oregon
 Hesperia comma (Linnaeus, 1758) – silver-spotted skipper or common branded skipper
 Hesperia dacotae (Skinner, 1911) – Dakota skipper
 Hesperia florinda (Butler, 1878)
 Hesperia juba (Scudder, 1872) – Juba skipper
 Hesperia leonardus (Harris, 1862) – Leonard's skipper
 Hesperia lindseyi (Holland, 1930) – Lindsey's skipper – Southwest Oregon,  California, Southwest Arizona
 Hesperia meskei W. H. Edwards, 1877 – Meke's skipper, Dixie skipper – Texas to Florida
 Hesperia metea Scudder, 1863 – cobweb skipper
 Hesperia miriamae MacNeill, 1959 – Sierra skipper – Inyo County, California
 Hesperia nabokovi (Bell & Comstock, 1948) Hispaniola
 Hesperia nevada (Scudder, 1874) – Nevada skipper
 Hesperia ottoe W. H. Edwards, 1866 – Ottoe skipper
 Hesperia pahaska Luessler, 1938 – Pahaska skipper
 Hesperia sassacus Harris, 1862 – Indian skipper
 Hesperia uncas W. H. Edwards, 1863 – Uncas skipper
 Hesperia viridis (W. H. Edwards, 1883) – green skipper – Mexico, New Mexico
 Hesperia woodgatei (R. C. Williams, 1914) – Apache skipper – Arizona, New Mexico, South Texas, North Mexico

Former species
Many species originally described in the genus Hesperia have now been reclassified. For a list of selected former species see List of former species in the genus Hesperia.

References and external links

Images representing Hesperia  at  Consortium for the Barcode of Life
Systematic list of the butterflies of Norway
Juba Skipper page
Jeff's Butterfly Page
Checklist of Butterflies of Tulare County
University of Colorado Museum
Gatrelle R. A subspecific assessment of the genus Hesperi (Hesperiinae) in eastern north America (Part I: The south)
Butterflies and Skippers of North America
Standardized Common North American Butterfly names
TC-ISBN Main List
Hesperia from Markku Savela's Lepidoptera site.
Lyman Entomological Museum and Research Laboratory

Specific

 
Hesperiidae genera
Hesperiini